Elizaveta Dubrovina (born 20 October 1993) is a Russian female acrobatic gymnast. With her partner Valentina Kim, Dubrovina won a silver medal in the 2014 Acrobatic Gymnastics World Championships.

References

External links

 

1993 births
Living people
Russian acrobatic gymnasts
Female acrobatic gymnasts
Medalists at the Acrobatic Gymnastics World Championships
21st-century Russian women